Gillian Wylie (née Totten; born in 1964 or 1965) is a Northern Irish football coach and former player. She played for the Northern Ireland women's national football team and for Arsenal and Croydon at club level.

Club career

After moving to London from her native Bangor, County Down, Wylie left Tottenham for Arsenal in 1991. She was the captain of Vic Akers' "treble" winning team in 1992–93.

In August 1995 Wylie suffered an anterior cruciate ligament injury. In 1997 Debbie Bampton persuaded Wylie to leave Arsenal for Croydon, where she regained full fitness and became an important player in the team which won the FA Women's Premier League National Division in 1998–99 and a League and Cup "double" in 1999–00.

Wylie was in favour of Croydon's controversial hostile takeover by Charlton Athletic: "It's been a bit of farce, but we want to affiliate with Charlton for long-term benefit". After briefly serving as player-manager, she resigned in November 2000, to be replaced by Keith Boanas.

International career

On 19 September 1982, 17-year-old Wylie scored Northern Ireland's goal against England at Gresty Road, Crewe, in a 7–1 1984 European Competition for Women's Football qualifying defeat.

In June 1985 she became the first female footballer ever to be sanctioned by UEFA, receiving a four-match ban for being sent-off in Northern Ireland's 1–0 1987 European Competition for Women's Football qualifying defeat by the Republic of Ireland at Milltown on 5 May 1985.

Personal life

Wylie is a graduate of Queen's University Belfast. Outside football, she worked in the financial services industry. She has two sons.

References

Living people
Women's association footballers from Northern Ireland
Northern Ireland women's international footballers
1953 births
Women's association football defenders
Female association football managers
Date of birth missing (living people)
Arsenal W.F.C. players
Charlton Athletic W.F.C. players
FA Women's National League players
Alumni of Queen's University Belfast